De Witt is a census-designated place (CDP) in the town of DeWitt, Onondaga County, New York, United States. It was first listed as a CDP prior to the 2020 census.

The CDP is in eastern Onondaga County, in the southern part of the town of DeWitt. It is bordered to the northwest by the city of Syracuse, to the north by the village of East Syracuse, and to the east and south by Interstate 481, which separates it from the rest of the town of DeWitt. East Genesee Street is the main road through the CDP, leading west  to downtown Syracuse and east  to Fayetteville. New York State Route 92 follows East Genesee Street within the De Witt CDP, while State Route 5 follows it in the eastern part of the CDP, before turning north to take Erie Boulevard toward downtown.

Le Moyne College is in the northwest corner of the CDP.

Demographics

References 

Census-designated places in Onondaga County, New York
Census-designated places in New York (state)